Poets and Madmen is the eleventh studio album by American heavy metal band Savatage, released in 2001. It was their last album before their 12-year hiatus, which lasted from 2002 to 2014. The album has a loose concept inspired by the career and death of journalist Kevin Carter, but has much less narrative in the lyrics than the previous two rock operas (Dead Winter Dead and The Wake of Magellan) penned by Paul O'Neill. Everything said in the album is fiction, except with regards to what is sung about Carter. The album is also noted as it is the only Savatage album to not feature a title song from the album, although the title was taken from lyrics to the track "Symmetry" from the band's 1994 album, Handful of Rain.

The album was the first since Streets: A Rock Opera in 1991 to feature the band's original vocalist Jon Oliva on lead vocals for all songs after the amicable departure of Zachary Stevens. It is also the first Savatage album to have guitarist Chris Caffery playing the majority of the guitar solos. This is partly due to the departure of Al Pitrelli, who left to join Megadeth prior to the album's release. However, Pitrelli was credited with the outro of "Stay With Me Awhile," the main solo of "Morphine Child," the main solo of "The Rumor," and the first part of the main solo and the outro of "Commissar". The United States bonus track "Shotgun Innocence" was originally a bonus track on the Japanese release of Edge of Thorns in 1993 and features Zachary Stevens on lead vocals, and the late Criss Oliva on guitar.

The album cover was drawn by Edgar Jerins, who was responsible for the covers of Dead Winter Dead and The Wake of Magellan.

Track listing

Personnel
Savatage
Jon Oliva – lead vocals, keyboards, rhythm guitar, co-producer
Chris Caffery – lead guitar, backing vocals
Johnny Lee Middleton – bass, backing vocals
Jeff Plate – drums, backing vocals

Additional musicians
Bob Kinkel – additional keyboards, backing vocals
Al Pitrelli – additional guitars on tracks "Stay with Me Awhile", "Commissar", "Morphine Child" and "The Rumor"
John West – backing vocals
Zachary Stevens – lead vocals on track 12 of US edition
Criss Oliva – guitars on track 12 of US edition

Production
Paul O'Neill – producer
Dave Wittman – engineer, mixing
Bob Kinkel – additional engineering
Darren Rapp, Ed Osbeck – assistant engineers 
Kevin Hodge – mastering at the Master Cutting Room, New York
Jeff Thompson, Chris Rich, Ken Thornhill – studio managers
Edgar Jerins – cover art
Deborah Lauren – design

Charts

Album

Singles

References

External links
The Story of Poets and Madmen

2001 albums
Savatage albums
Concept albums
SPV/Steamhammer albums
Albums produced by Paul O'Neill (rock producer)
Nuclear Blast albums